1948 in Sri Lanka marks the turn from the British Ceylon period to independent modern Sri Lanka. The year saw Sri Lanka, then British Ceylon, regain its independence becoming the Dominion of Ceylon.

Incumbents

British Ceylon (Until 4 February)

Dominion of Ceylon (From 4 February)

Events

January
 1 January –

February
 4 February – British Ceylon is disestablished as Sri Lanka regains its independence as the Dominion of Ceylon.
 23 February – The film Kapati Arakshakaya is released.

March
 19 March – The Australian cricket team stopped over in Ceylon, En route to England during their 1948 tour of England, where they played a one-day single-innings match—not limited overs—against the Ceylon national team at the Colombo Oval.

April

May
 22 May – The film Divya Premaya is released.

June
 4 July – Ceylonese are included in the list of British 1948 Birthday Honours.

July
 29 July-14 August – Ceylon participates for the first time in the Summer Olympics in London sending 7 athletes.
 31 July – Duncan White wins the silver medal in the Men's 400 metres hurdles becoming the first Ceylonese athlete to win an Olympic medal.

August
 20 August – The controversial Ceylon Citizenship Act is passed in parliarment.

September

October

November
 15 November – Ceylon Citizenship Act becomes law qualifying only about 5,000 Indian Tamils for citizenship. More than 700,000 people, about 11% of the population, were denied citizenship and made stateless.

December
 3 December – The film Veradunu Kurumanama is released.

Births

January

February
 2 February - Lakshman Kiriella, (lawyer, politician)
 21 February - Sumana Amarasinghe, (actress)

March

April
 13 April - Arul Pragasam, 71 (d. 2019), (activist and rebel)
 24 April - Gangodawila Soma Thero, 55 (d. 2003), (Buddhist monk)

May
 11 May - Nirj Deva, (Sri Lankan-British politician)

June
 8 June - D. A. M. R. Samarasekara, (Admiral)
 12 June - Jayalath Manoratne, 71 (d. 2020), (actor)
 21 June - Rukman Senanayake (politician)

July
 4 July - 
 Wimal Kumara de Costa, 68 (d. 2016), (actor)
 Suminda Sirisena (actor)
 11 July - Duleep De Chickera, (Anglican Bishop of Colombo)
 17 July - Cletus Mendis (actor)
 22 July - Chandran Rutnam, (filmmaker and entrepreneur)
 24 July - K. Sri Dhammaratana, (Buddhist monk)

August

September

October
23 October - M. H. M. Ashraff, 51 (d. 2000), (lawyer, politician)

November

December

Unknown
 Sabaratnam Arulkumaran, (physician)
 Maru Sira, (d. 1975), (criminal)

Deaths
February
 6 February - Bernard Henry Bourdillon, 64 (b. 1883), (British colonial administrator)

See also
Years in Sri Lanka

References

 
1940s in Ceylon
Sri Lanka
Sri Lanka
Years of the 20th century in Sri Lanka